This article is the electoral history of R. B. Bennett, the eleventh Prime Minister of Canada.

A Conservative, he served one term as prime minister (1930 to 1935).  He won one general election (1930), defeating Prime Minister Mackenzie King.  He in turn was defeated by King in the 1935 election.

Bennett stood for election to the House of Commons of Canada eight times, winning six times (1911, 1925, 1926, 1930 (twice), and 1935) and losing twice (1900 and 1921).

Bennett was elected leader of the Conservative Party in 1927, at the first leadership convention held by the Conservatives.

He was elected three times to the territorial Legislative Assembly, in two general elections and one by-election. Upon the formation of the Province of Alberta, he was the first leader of the provincial Conservative Party, unsuccessfully contesting the general election of 1905 and serving as Leader of the Opposition after the election of 1909.

After retiring from Canadian politics, Bennett moved to England, where he was appointed to the House of Lords in the British Parliament.

Summary 

Bennett ranks eleventh out of twenty-three prime ministers for time in office, serving one term of five years and 77 days.

He was the first of three prime ministers from Alberta, the others being Joe Clark and Stephen Harper.

Bennett served in the two governments of Arthur Meighen.  When Meighen resigned after losing the 1926 general election to Mackenzie King, Bennett won the first leadership convention ever held by the Conservative Party, in 1927.  He became the Leader of the Opposition.  In the 1930 election, called at the beginning of the Great Depression, Bennett led the Conservatives to victory, ousting King and the Liberals.  However, five years later, in the 1935 election, King won a majority and returned to power.  Bennett resigned the leadership of the Conservative Party in 1938 and retired from politics.

Bennett stood for election to the Canadian House of Commons eight times. He was elected six times in the riding of Calgary West, Alberta (1911, 1925, 1926, 1930 (twice), and 1935) and defeated twice (1900 and 1921).  He did not stand for election in the general election of 1917. He served in the Commons for a total of 19 years, 5 months, and 9 days.

Upon the creation of Alberta, Bennett led the Alberta Conservative Party in the general election of 1905 but was roundly defeated by Alexander Rutherford and the Alberta Liberal Party. Bennett also lost the election for his own seat and thus not a member of the Legislative Assembly. Although he was not the leader of the party in 1909, he again stood for election in the 1909 provincial election and this time was elected. The Liberals again won a majority. Bennett was chosen by the Conservative caucus to become Leader of the Opposition.

Following his retirement from politics in 1938, Bennett moved to England. in 1941 he was granted a peerage, as "Viscount Bennett of Mickleham in the County of Surrey and of Calgary and Hopewell in the Dominion of Canada", which entitled him to sit in the House of Lords.

Federal general elections, 1930 and 1935 

Bennett led the Conservative Party in two general elections, winning once (1930) and losing once (1935).

Canadian federal election, 1930 

Bennett won a solid majority government after the 1930 election, defeating Mackenzie King and the Liberals.  King remained as leader of the Liberal Party and became Leader of the Opposition.

1 Leader of the Opposition when election was called;  Prime Minister after election.
2 Prime Minister when election was called;  Leader of the Opposition after the election.
3 Rounding error.

Canadian federal election, 1935

In the 1935 election, King and the Liberals decisively defeated Bennett and the Conservatives.  Bennett stayed on as leader of the Conservative Party until his successor, Robert Manion, was elected in 1938.

1 Leader of the Opposition when election was called;  Prime Minister after election.
2 Prime Minister when election was called;  Leader of the Opposition after the election.
3 Less than 0.05% of national vote.
4 Table does not include parties which received votes but did not elect any members.

Federal constituency elections, 1900, 1911, 1921 to 1935
Bennett stood for election to the House of Commons eight times, once in the North-West Territories and subsequently in the province of Alberta.  He won six times and lost twice.

1900 Federal Election:  Alberta (Provisional District) 

 Elected. 
X Incumbent.

1911 Federal Election:  Calgary  

 Elected. 
1 Rounding error.

1921 Federal Election:  Calgary West 

 Elected. 
1 Rounding error.

1925 Federal Election:  Calgary West 

 Elected. 
X Incumbent.

1926 Federal Election:  Calgary West 

 Elected. 
X Incumbent.

1930 Federal Election:  Calgary West 

 Elected. 
X Incumbent.

1930 Federal Ministerial By-Election:  Calgary West 

 Elected. 
X Incumbent.

At this time, newly appointed Cabinet ministers had to stand for re-election, but it was customary for the other political party not to oppose the election.

1935 Federal Election:  Calgary West 

 Elected. 
X Incumbent. 
1 Rounding error.

constituency elections, 1898 to 1902 

1898  Election:  West Calgary 

 Elected.

1901  By-election:  West Calgary 

 Elected. 
X Incumbent.

Bennett resigned his seat in the territorial assembly to stand in the 1900 federal election, unsuccessfully.  He then contested his former territorial seat in the by-election.

1902  Election:  West Calgary 

 Elected. 
X Incumbent.

Alberta general election, 1905 

The 1905 general election was the first election after Alberta was established as a province. Bennett led the Alberta Conservative Party in the general election but was roundly defeated by Alexander Rutherford and the Alberta Liberal Party.  Bennett was not elected to his own seat, and the Conservatives only elected two members to the Legislative Assembly.

1 Premier when election was called;  Premier after election.
2 Did not win his own seat, so did not become Leader of the Opposition after the election.
3 Rounding error.

Alberta constituency elections, 1905 and 1909 
Bennett stood for election in two general elections in Alberta, in 1905 and 1909.  He did not win his own seat in 1905 and did not become Leader of the Opposition.  He stood again in the 1909 election and won his seat. He again became leader of the party and Leader of the Opposition.  He resigned in 1910 to enter federal politics.

1905 Alberta Election: Calgary 

 Elected.

1909 Alberta Election: Calgary 

Note:  the constituency returned two members at this time.

 Elected. 
X Incumbent. 
1 Rounding error.

Municipal politics, New Brunswick 

Bennett began his political career in 1896 at the age of 26, when he was persuaded by a young Max Aitken, the future Lord Beaverbrook, to stand for election as an alderman.  He was elected to the city council of Chatham, New Brunswick by a margin of 19 votes out of 691.  He also served on the county government of Northumberland County, New Brunswick (1896-1897).

Conservative Party leadership convention, 1927 

Bennett was elected leader of the Conservative Party on the second ballot at the leadership convention of 1927.  He was the first Conservative leader elected by a convention.

1 Rounding error.

Peerage and the House of Lords 

After he quit Canadian politics, Bennett retired to England.  In 1941, the King appointed him to the peerage, with the dignity of "Viscount Bennett of Mickleham in the County of Surrey and of Calgary and Hopewell in the Dominion of Canada."  The peerage entitled him to sit in the House of Lords.

See also 

 Electoral history of William Lyon Mackenzie King - Bennett's predecessor and successor as Prime Minister.
 Electoral history of Arthur Meighen -  Bennett's predecessor as leader of the Conservative Party.

References

External links 

 Library of Parliament – History of Federal Ridings since 1867
 CPAC – 1927 Conservative Leadership Convention

Bennett, R. B.